Clyde Fitch Carpenter (April 17, 1908 – December 5, 1971) was an American football coach.  He served as the head football coach at the University of Montana in 1942 and Montana State University from 1946 to 1949, compiling a career college football coach record of 13–28–2. Carpenter was the head football coach at Billings High School in Billings, Montana from 1932 to 1941. Carpenter was born on April 17, 1908, in Hudson, South Dakota.  He died on December 5, 1971, at a hospital in Missoula, Montana.

Head coaching record

College

References

External links
 

1908 births
1971 deaths
Basketball coaches from Montana
Basketball coaches from South Dakota
Montana Grizzlies football coaches
Montana Grizzlies football players
Montana State Bobcats football coaches
High school football coaches in Montana
People from Lincoln County, South Dakota
Players of American football from Montana
Sportspeople from Billings, Montana